Carlo Urbino (1525/30–1585) was an Italian painter of the Renaissance.

He was born in Crema. His style recalls the mannerist work of the Campi family: Antonio, Bernardino, and Giulio .  He trained in the Veneto and is known to have participated in drawings for a treatise on the science of armaments by Camillo Agrippa. In 1556, he painted the canvas of Christ and Mother and an Assumption of the Virgin for Santa Maria presso San Celso in Milan.  He helped decorate a Chapel in Santa Maria della Passione.  Later he worked with Bernardino Campi, for example in the  Transfiguration (1565) in the church of San Fedele in Milan. The canvas of  Doubting Thomas  is found in the Pinacoteca di Brera. He painted in the Chapel of the Angels in Sant'Eustorgio, a Pentecost in the church of San Marco. In the 1570s, he returned to Crema, where he painted a canvas for the Sanctuary of Santa Maria della Croce, and in Sabbioneta, painted frescoes for the Palazzo del Giardino of Vespasiano Gonzaga.

References
    
 Derived from the entry in Italian.

People from Crema, Lombardy
16th-century Italian painters
Italian male painters
Painters from Cremona
Italian Mannerist painters
Year of birth uncertain
16th-century births
1585 deaths